The Digital Party is a Uruguayan political party.

Founded in 2013 and registered in 2018, they advocate for political transparency and direct engagement of the citizens via social networks and other e-democracy tools. Other than this, the party has no consistent other ideology, as official policy positions are voted on by party members online.

They took part in the 2019 Uruguayan general election, with their leader Daniel Goldman running as their presidential candidate.

Electoral history

Presidential elections

Chamber of Deputies and Senate elections

References

Political parties in Uruguay
E-democracy
Internet in Uruguay